Cladophlebis is an extinct form genus of fern, used to refer to Paleozoic and Mesozoic fern leaves that have "fern fronds with pinnules that are attached to the rachis, and have a median vein that runs to the apex of the pinnule, and veins from that are curved and dichotomise". By convention this genus is not used to refer to fossil ferns from the Cenozoic. Ferns with this morphology belong to several families, including Osmundaceae, Dicksoniaceae and Schizaeaceae. Ferns with this morphology are common during the Paleozoic and Mesozoic in both the northern and southern hemispheres.

Species 
There were many species of Cladophlebis, including: C. akhtashensis, C. arctica, C. browniana, C. denticulata, C. dunberi, C. haiburnensis, C. heterophylla, C. hirta, C. impressa, C. kurtzi, C. lobifolia, C. nebbensis, C. patagonica, C. phlebopteris, C. porsildi, C. readi, C. remota, C. retallackii, C. roessertii, C. septentrionalis, C. simplicima, C. spectabilis, C. tenuis, C. wyomingensis, and C. yanschinii.

Distribution 
Fossils of Cladophlebis have been found in many locations around the world, among others in the Valle Alto Formation of Caldas and the Caballos Formation of Tolima, Colombia, and the Winton Formation, Eromanga Basin, Queensland, Australia.

References

Bibliography

External links 

 
 Cladophlebis austalis Natural History Museum
 Range map for Cladophlebis from the PaleoBiology Database

† Cladophlebis
Permian plants
Triassic plants
Jurassic plants
Cretaceous plants
Permian first appearances
Cretaceous extinctions
Mesozoic Antarctica
Mesozoic life of Asia
Mesozoic life of Europe
Mesozoic life of North America
Prehistoric plants of North America
Mesozoic life of South America
Prehistoric plants of South America
Triassic Argentina
Jurassic Argentina
Fossils of Argentina
Triassic Chile
Jurassic Chile
Fossils of Chile
Jurassic Colombia
Fossils of Colombia
Fossil taxa described in 1849